Thlaspi cyprium, the Cyprus penny-cress, is a perennial herb, flowering from February to May.

Habitat 
Moist rocky slopes and near streams on igneous rocks at 900–1900 m altitudes.

Distribution 
Endemic to Cyprus, very common in the Troödos forest, but occurs in other areas as well: Khionistra, Prodromos, Kryos Potamos, Almyrolivadho, Pashia Livadhi, Papoutsa, Saranti, Lagoudhera, Platania, Kionia.

References

 Flora of Cyprus Volume 1, Robert Desmond Meikle, Bentham-Moxon Trust, The Herbarium Royal Botanic Gardens Kew, 1985, 
 The Endemic Plants of Cyprus, Texts: Takis Ch. Tsintides, Photographs: Laizos Kourtellarides, Cyprus Association of Professional Foresters, Bank of Cyprus Group, Nicosia 1998,

External links
 http://botany.cz/en/thlaspi-cyprium/
 http://www.natureofcyprus.org/uploadimages/Thlaspicyprium600450endem.jpg
 http://www.theplantlist.org/tpl/record/tro-100359067

Brassicaceae
Endemic flora of Cyprus